Tinputz is an Austronesian language spoken in Tinputz Rural LLG of Bougainville, Papua New Guinea.

References

Northwest Solomonic languages
Languages of Papua New Guinea
Languages of the Autonomous Region of Bougainville